Forshev is a Russian masculine surname, its feminine counterpart is Forsheva. Notable people with the surname include:

Dmitry Forshev (born 1976), Russian sprinter
Olesya Forsheva (born 1979), Russian sprinter

Russian-language surnames